Bayern (D183) was the third ship of the Hamburg-class destroyer of the German Navy.

Background 
The Type 101 Hamburg class was the only class of destroyers built during post-war Germany. They were specifically designed to operate in the Baltic Sea, where armament and speed is more important than seaworthiness. They were named after Bundesländer (states of Germany) of West Germany.

The German shipyard Stülcken was contracted to design and build the ships. Stülcken was rather inexperienced with naval shipbuilding, but got the order, since the shipyards traditionally building warships for the German navies like Blohm + Voss, Howaldtswerke or Lürssen were all occupied constructing commercial vessels.

Construction and career
Bayern was laid down on 15 February 1961 and launched on 14 August 1962 in Hamburg. She was commissioned on 6 July 1965 and decommissioned on 16 December 1993. Finally towed to Denmark and scrapped in 1998.

The name Bayern was used again in 1994 for the frigate F217.

References

Hamburg-class destroyers
1962 ships
Ships built in Hamburg